Primavera in anticipo and Primavera anticipada (English: Early Spring) are the Italian- and Spanish-language versions of the tenth studio album by Italian singer Laura Pausini, released by Warner Music on 11 November 2008.

Produced by Pausini with Paolo Carta, Celso Valli and Dado Parisini, the album has been described by Pausini as "a complex album, in which I can completely recognize myself".

It is Pausini's first album of new material since Resta in ascolto / Escucha, released in 2004. The album was described by music critics as Pausini's most personal album to date. Pausini co-wrote each song included in the album, except the track "Prima che esci" / "Antes de irte", written by Italian rock singer-songwriter Gianluca Grignani. 
The album features the song "Primavera in anticipo (It Is My Song)" / "Primavera anticipada (It Is My Song)", a duet with English singer James Blunt, and also includes collaborations with Italian songwriters Niccolò Agliardi, Cheope and Daniel Vuletic.

The album debuted at number one on the Italian Albums Chart and held the top spot for nine consecutive weeks, It was later certified Diamond by the Federation of the Italian Music Industry. The album has sold 500,000 copies in Italy and 1,500,000 copies worldwide.

Its Spanish-language version also won Best Female Pop Vocal Album at the Latin Grammy Awards of 2009.

The album was anticipated by the single "Invece no" / "En cambio no", released on 24 October 2008. The song was also translated in Portuguese with the title "Agora não" and included in the Brazilian and Portuguese version of the album. It also spawned the singles "Primavera in anticipo (It Is My Song)" / "Primavera anticipada (It Is My Song)" and "Un fatto ovvio" / "Un hecho obvio".

Background, conception and themes
Pausini started working on the album in late 2007, and spent most of 2008 writing and recording it between Italy, London and Los Angeles.

The album was inspired by the events in Pausini's life between 2004 and 2008. In an interview Pausini explained that those years were marked by different kinds of feelings, therefore the album represents four different moments, symbolized by the four astronomical seasons. 
For that reason, Primavera in anticipo was described by Italian music critics as Pausini's most personal and mature recording, exploring themes such as self-love, the relationship with her new partner and guitarist Paolo Carta, and grief for her grandmother's death.

Particularly, Pausini dedicated to her grandmother the lead single from the album "Invece no" / "En cambio no", a song focused on the pain of those who weren't able to confess everything to a loved person who died:

Among all the song I wrote and sang during my career, this is the one which scares me the most, but it also makes me calm more than every other one. It was composed at the piano, and I wrote the music with Paolo Carta. The lyrics, written by me and Niccolò Agliardi, were inspired by my grandmother's dead. She was a fundamental figure in my life. I thought about the pain that a lot of people felt because they weren't able to tell each other everything they wanted. I care a lot about this reflection.

Pausini later added:

It came from my desire to tell people to not be afraid to speak up. I've lived the pain of a goodbye and of realizing you haven't said all you needed to say. Fortunately, when my grandmother died, I had told her everything.

The track "La geografia del mio cammino" / "La geografía de mi camino" cites Pausini's first single, "La solitudine" / "La soledad", "Loneliness" in English, describing solitude as a goal to be reached and not as an unease. The song is about Pausini's will to look inside herself and not to lose self-confidence even in the darkest moments.

The only song in the album which is not focused on personal feelings is "Sorella terra" / "Hermana tierra", a prayer dedicated to Earth and inspired by Al Gore's environmental activist movement.

Reception

Critical reception

The album received positive reviews by various music critics. Allmusic'''s Jason Birchmeier praised Pausini's voice and songwriting and claimed that the album showcases "a more personalized cycle of songs", but also noted a stylistic similarity with her 2004's Escucha, resulting in a "sense of frustration for anyone hoping for a change in direction".

Antonio Orlando, writing for the Italian music magazine Musica e dischi, stated that the album is completely coherent with her style and commented that, even if lyrics aren't grammatically perfect, it is "an unexceptionable album in every detail".
Italian newspaper La Stampa gave the album a positive review too, in which Pausini is praised for the intensity of her renditions and is claimed that she is "more comfortable in songwriting" and that she manages "one of the most personal voices in the worldwide pop scene".

Chart performance
The album debuted at number one on the Italian Albums Chart and stayed atop the chart for 9 consecutive weeks.
The album has sold over 500,000 copies in Italy and has been certified 7-times Platinum by the Federation of the Italian Music Industry. 
In Switzerland Primavera in anticipo debuted and peaked at number four on the Swiss Albums Chart and was later certified Platinum by the International Federation of the Phonographic Industry of Switzerland.

Both the Italian and Spanish versions of the album were released in three Latin American countries, including Mexico, where the Italian version peaked at number 67, while the Spanish version of the album debuted and peaked at number 8, spent 21 weeks on the Top 100 and was certified Gold by the Asociación Mexicana de Productores de Fonogramas y Videogramas.

Promotion
To promote the album, Pausini embarked on her World Tour 2009, a concert tour which started from Turin on 5 March 2009, reached Europe in May 2009 and then South America and the United States in Autumn 2009. The last leg of the tour took place in Italy in November 2009. 
A CD of the tour, along with a DVD, was released on 27 November 2009 with the title Laura Live World Tour 09 / Laura Live Gira Mundial 09.

Track listing
Primavera in anticipo

Primavera anticipada

Charts

Weekly charts

Year-end charts

Certifications and sales

Personnel
Credits adapted from Primavera in anticipo'''s liner notes:

Production credits

 Jonathan Allen – engineer
 Luca Bignardi – programming, engineer, mixing
 Chirs Bolse – assistant
 Matteo Bolzoni – assistant, engineer
 Marco Borsatti – assistant, engineer
 Paolo Carta – producer, programming, engineer
 Max "MC" Costa – programming, sound design
 Nicola Fantozzi – engineer, assistant engineer
 Gabriele Gigli – assistant
 Bernie Grundman – mastering
 Jon Jacobs – mixing
 Steve Lyon – engineer
 Davide Palmiotto – assistant
 Gabriele Parisi – engineer
 Dado Parisini – producer
 Fabio Patrignani – engineer
 Fabrizio Pausini – studio manager
 Laura Pausini – producer
 Stéphane Reichart – engineer
 Celso Valli – producer

Music credits

 Niccolò Agliardi – composer
 Prisca Amori – concertmaster
 B.I.M. Orchestra – strings
 The children of the "Sylvia Young School" – backing vocals
 Curt Bisquera – drums, percussions
 James Blunt – vocals, composer
 Paolo Carta – arrangements, string arrangements, guitars, composer
 Cesare Chiodo – bass
 Daniele Coro – composer
 Cheope – composer
 Manuela Cortesi – backing vocals
 Stefano De Marco – backing vocals
 Lance Ellington – backing vocals
 Emiliano Fantuzzi – guitars
 Gabriele Fersini – guitars
 Federica Fratoni – composer
 Andy Findon – flute, pan flute
 Riccardo Galardini – guitars
 Antonio Galbiati – composer
 Alfredo Golino – drums
 Roberta Granà – backing vocals
 Isobelle Griffith – orchestra contractor
 Gianluca Grignani – composer
 Peter Howarth – backing vocals
 London Orchestra – orchestra
 Jenny O'Grady – choral co-ordination
 Charlotte Matthews – orchestra contractor (assistant)
 Perry Montague Mason – concertmaster
 Dado Parisini – piano, keyboards, string arrangements, arrangements
 Laura Pausini – vocals, backing vocals, composer
 Rocco Petruzzi – string arrangements, orchestra contractor
 Roma Sinfonietta's Orchestra – orchestra
 Hayley Sanderson – backing vocals
 Luca Scarpa – piano, hammond
 Giorgio Secco – guitars
 Beverly Skett – backing vocals
 Giuseppe Tortora – orchestra contractor
 Celso Valli – arrangements, piano, keyboards, string arrangements
 Massimo Varini – guitars
 Daniel Vuletic – composer

Release history

References

External links
 Official website

2008 albums
Laura Pausini albums
2008 video albums
Italian-language albums
Spanish-language albums
Latin Grammy Award for Best Female Pop Vocal Album
Warner Records albums